Callulina hanseni, or Hansen's warty frog, is a frog in the family Brevicipitidae endemic to Tanzania. It has been observed in the Nguru South Mountains.

References

Frogs of Africa
Amphibians described in 2010
hanseni
Endemic fauna of Tanzania